"Warriors" is a song written and recorded by English musician Gary Numan, released in 1983 as both a seven- and 12-single from his fifth solo studio album, Warriors. Numan promoted the song on many popular television shows such as The Saturday Show and Crackerjack. It peaked at No. 20 on the UK Singles Chart, and was Numan's final Top 20 hit until 2003.

Of the song Numan commented: "Warriors was about how I felt being a pop star more or less, I felt I was losing it and slipping down the ladder of success. The line “The ghost of the white faced clown” was a direct reference back to the old images that I'd had before and I wanted to establish that was all done and gone, I was over my Star Wars, Buck Rogers type period".

The music video for the song shown on Top of the Pops shows Numan's love of flying and his new Mad Max-style image. He commented: "I had a lot of fun making the video for the single, sort of a mix between joy and terror. I think 'Warriors' is probably by far my favourite song on the album".

Although the 7" and 12" versions of the track are the same, the album version ran for almost two minutes longer with an extended instrumental section at the end.

Track listing
 12" Single
"Warriors" – 4:08
"My Car Slides (1)" – 3:01
"My Car Slides (2)" – 4:42

 7" Single
"Warriors" – 4:08
"My Car Slides (1)" – 3:01

Chart performance

References

External links
 

1983 singles
1983 songs
Gary Numan songs
Beggars Banquet Records singles
Songs written by Gary Numan